Verlorevlei River is a river in the Western Cape province of South Africa. Lying on the Sandveld of the West Coast, the river runs past Eendekuil, Het Kruis, and Redelinghuys. The river mouth is located at Elands Bay. Its tributaries include the Hol River, Kruismans River and the Krom Antonies River. It falls within the Drainage system G and the Management Area.

The river is the only known habitat of the endangered Verlorenvlei redfin.

Around 30 km northwest of Redelinghuys, a marshy lake feeds the river. In the winter, it is kilometers long, and the water is concealed under the green reeds. In summer, the lake runs dry. 500 species of birds have been spotted here. The lake is popular with bird watchers and anglers alike. One of the country's few freshwater lakes by the coast, Verlorevlei Lake is an important breeding and feeding ground for pelicans, flamingoes, and other bird and fish species. Many species of plants are also found there. Cattle graze on the shores and water is pumped out for irrigation. Simon van der Stel visited in 1685 on his journey to Namaqualand, and he was under the impression that the river was a tributary of the Olifants River. Ensign Johannes Tobias Rhenius saw the lake as "lost" in the reeds in 1724, giving it its name ("verlore" is Afrikaans for "lost," "vlei" for "lake"). In 1991, the wetland was named a Ramsar site.

See also
 List of rivers of South Africa
 List of drainage basins of South Africa
 Water Management Areas

References

Rivers of the Western Cape